This list of members of the Congress of the Philippines by wealth includes only the fifty richest current members of the Congress of the Philippines based on their statement of assets, liabilities and net worth as of December 31, 2018 for the House of Representatives and as of December 31, 2019 for the Senate.

List of members by net worth

Notes

References 

Philippine Congress
Congress
Congress of the Philippines